The internal nasal branches of infraorbital nerve are small branches which can supply the septum.

References

Nose
Maxillary nerve